The National Library And Archives (NLA) is a leading research and archival institution based in Abu Dhabi charged with preserving and documenting the history and heritage of the United Arab Emirates and the Persian Gulf region in general. The NLA was established in 1968 by Zayed bin Sultan Al Nahyan, first President of the UAE, under the name of Center for Documentation and Research (CDR). Forty years later, the then  UAE President Sheikh Khalifa bin Zayed Al Nahyan issued Law No. (7) for 2008 designating the Center as the official National Archives of the UAE, under the name National Center for Documentation and Research (NCDR). The law specifies the NCDR jurisdiction to collect, preserve and archive documents to promote cultural and historical awareness and provide researchers access to the valuable materials held by the Center. In 2014, Sheikh Khalifa bin Zayed Al Nahyan issued the federal law no. (1) of 2014, changing the name to National Archives.

As of 2021 the NLA was ranked the sixth most advanced organization in its category worldwide in term of the tools and technology employed.

Vision and mission
Under the directives of its Chairman, Sheikh Mansour bin Zayed Al Nahyan, Deputy Prime Minister and Minister of Presidential Affairs, the NA acts as the Nation's Memory. The NA's Mission is to preserve documentary heritage through distinctive archival, documentation and research services in order to provide decision makers and the public with trusted information and to enhance civic spirit and national identity, while its Vision is to provide distinctive archival, documentation and research services.

The NLA is the trusted custodian of the Government records of the UAE responsible for:

 Developing government archives through application of best archival policies and procedures.
 Building our collections through constant expansion of our archives, library and research facilities.
 Preserving our collections by ensuring protection and restoration of  the acquisitions.
 Making  our holdings widely available and easily accessible through in-house facilities and outreach programs.

Services and publications
To achieve its mission, the NLA publishes historical books and research studies which serve as valuable reference and source material for students and researchers specializing in the history and heritage of the UAE and the Persian Gulf region.

The NLA sponsors international and regional seminars, conferences and exhibitions and publishes journals and newsletters.  
The NLA Archives include American, British, Portuguese, French, Dutch, German, Ottoman and GCC documents and an impressive audio-visual collection.

The Emirates Library of the NA has specialized reference books, journals and university theses also available in electronic format.  The NLA printing press publishes all NA as well as ministerial publications.

Other services

The NLA's state-of-the-art premises include a permanent exhibition displaying valuable documents, maps, photographs and rare books; a 600-seat auditorium 3-D Virtual Reality Hall.

Affiliations

The National Library And Archives is a member of the following organizations:

 United Nations Educational, Scientific, and Cultural Organization (UNESCO)
 The International Council on Archives (ICA)
 International Federation for Libraries and Information (IFLA)
 Secretariat General, Center of Documents and Studies of the Gulf Cooperation Council (GCC)
 Arab Federation for Libraries and Information (AFLI)
 Middle East Studies Association (MESA)
 Oral History Association (OHA)

References

External links 
 National Library And Archives Website
 National Archives of the United Arab Emirates at Google Cultural Institute

Organisations based in Abu Dhabi
Government agencies of the United Arab Emirates
1968 establishments in the Trucial States
Government agencies established in 1968